WLMS may refer to:

 WLMS-LD, a low-power television station (channel 25) licensed to serve Columbus, Mississippi, United States
 WLMS (FM), a defunct radio station (88.3 FM) formerly licensed to serve Lecanto, Florida, United States
 WCMX, a radio station (1000 AM) licensed to serve Leominster, Massachusetts, United States, which held the call sign WLMS from 1967 to 1982